Guen is a village in the Central African Republic.

References 

Populated places in the Central African Republic